Bromo Arts District is one of four designated arts district in Baltimore, MD and is centered around the Emerson Bromo-Seltzer Tower, which houses artist studios. The district is roughly bounded by Park Avenue on the east, Lombard Street on the south, Paca Street on the west and Martin Luther King Jr. Boulevard and Read Street on the north and is adjacent to the neighborhoods of Mount Vernon and downtown Baltimore. It is home to the University of Maryland Medical Center, Lexington Market, Westminster Hall and Edgar Allan Poe's gravesite, the former Martick's Restaurant Francais and many cultural institutions including the Hippodrome Theatre, the Everyman Theatre, the Eubie Blake National Jazz and Cultural Center. It is also home to A.T. Jones and Sons, the oldest costume company in the United States.

The official name of the organization is The Bromo Tower Arts and Entertainment District.  The offices are located in the Maryland Art Place building located at 218 W. Saratoga Street.  The Executive Director is Stephen Yasko who was previously the founding General Manager and Executive Director of WTMD 89.7 FM. Yasko took over the leadership of the organization in October 2016.  The board of directors is chaired by Vincent Lancisi of the Everyman Theatre.

Organizations

 Current Space
 Le Mondo
 Maryland Art Place
 EMP Collective
 Gallery Four
 14 Karat Cabaret
 SubBasement Artist Studios
 Jordan Faye Contemporary
 Artstar Custom Paintworks
 Sophiajacob
 Rock 512 Devil
 Maryland Historical Society
 Summa The Whole Gallery
 Arena Players
 H&H Building
 ArteFactory Baltimore
 National Museum of Dentistry
 Dance Baltimore
 MUSE 360
 Downtown Cultural Arts Center
 Maryland Women's Heritage Center
 Market Center Merchants Association

References

External links
official website

Central Baltimore
Neighborhoods in Baltimore
Economy of Baltimore
Entertainment districts in the United States
Arts districts